Jim Tait was an Australian former professional rugby league footballer who played in the 1920s and 1930s. He played for the South Sydney in the New South Wales Rugby League (NSWRL) competition.

Playing career
Tait was a Redfern United junior and made his first grade debut for South Sydney in round 9 of the 1928 NSWRL season against North Sydney at North Sydney Oval. Despite playing with Souths for nearly 12 seasons, Tait only made 16 first grade appearances for South Sydney.

Representative career
Tait was selected by New South Wales in 1931 and played in two matches against Brisbane firsts and Toowoomba.

References

New South Wales rugby league team players
South Sydney Rabbitohs players
Rugby league players from Sydney
Australian rugby league players
Rugby league centres
Rugby league locks